The IIHF World U20 Championship Division III is played every year among the ice hockey teams under the age of 20 who were placed in Division III in the previous year.

Until 2001 the tournament was known as the D-series.

Results

References